Sidney Wallace Tinsley (January 14, 1920 – June 3, 2006) was an American football punter in the National Football League (NFL). Tinsley played for one season for the Pittsburgh Steelers in 1945. He played college football at Clemson.

College career
Tinsley played college football for the Clemson Tigers program. While at Clemson, Tinsley was a running back.

NFL career
After college, Tinsley played in the NFL for the Pittsburgh Steelers during their 1945 season. Although he was a running back at Clemson, the Steelers primarily used Tinsley as punter. Tinsley did rush the ball 5 times for 3 yards. Tinsley also recorded an interception and recovered a fumble. However, Tinsley's greatest accomplishment came through his punting, as he led the league in punts (57) and punting yards (2,308) in 1945.

References

Bibliography

1920 births
2006 deaths
American football halfbacks
American football punters
American football running backs
Clemson Tigers football players
People from Spartanburg, South Carolina
Pittsburgh Steelers players
Players of American football from South Carolina